Seychelles Premier League is the top division of the Seychelles Football Federation, it was created in 1979.

Members clubs 2017

Previous winners

1979 : Saint-Louis FC
1980 : Saint-Louis FC
1981 : Saint-Louis FC
1982 : Mont Fleuri FC
1983 : Saint-Louis FC
1984 : Mont Fleuri FC
1985 : Saint-Louis FC
1986 : Saint-Louis FC
1987 : Saint-Louis FC
1988 : Saint-Louis FC
1989 : Saint-Louis FC
1990 : Saint-Louis FC
1991 : Saint-Louis FC
1992 : Saint-Louis FC
1993 : no championship
1994 : Saint-Louis FC
1995 : Sunshine SC
1996 : St Michel United FC
1997 : St Michel United FC
1998 : Red Star
1999 : St Michel United FC
2000 : St Michel United FC
2001 : Red Star
2002 : La Passe FC and St Michel United FC (shared title)
2003 : St Michel United FC
2004 : La Passe FC
2005 : La Passe FC
2006 : Anse Réunion FC
2007 : St Michel United FC
2008 : St Michel United FC
2009 : La Passe FC
2010 : St Michel United FC
2011 : St Michel United FC
2012 : St Michel United FC
2013 : Côte d'Or FC
2014 : St Michel United FC
2015 : St Michel United FC
2016 : Côte d'Or FC
2017 : Saint Louis Suns United
2018 : Côte d'Or FC
2019–20: Foresters
2020−21: Canceled
2022: La Passe FC

Performance by club

Top scorers

References

External links
Seychelles Premier League , Fifa.com 
Seychelles - List of Champions, RSSSF.com
Football teams Seychelles
Seychelles first division league summary, soccer24.com

Football leagues in Seychelles
Seychelles
1979 establishments in Seychelles